Paul Angelis (18 January 1943 – 19 March 2009) was an English actor and writer, best known for his role as PC Bruce Bannerman in the BBC police series Z-Cars and as Navy Rum in Porridge as well as doing many voices in the film Yellow Submarine.

Early life
Angelis was born in Dingle, Liverpool to an English mother, Margaret (née McCulla), and a Greek father, Evangelos Angelis. He attended St Francis Xavier's Grammar School, Liverpool and St Mungo's Academy, Glasgow then worked for merchant banks for six years before training as an actor at the Royal Scottish Academy of Music and Drama. Having moved to London, he then toured with a children's theatre company.

Career
Angelis provided the voice of Ringo Starr, George Harrison, and the Chief Blue Meanie in the film Yellow Submarine.

Television and film 
He appeared in many British television programmes such as George and Mildred, Thriller, Callan, The Liver Birds, The Onedin Line, Man About the House, Quiller, The Sweeney - as armed robber and hard man, Barney Prince (episode: "Stoppo Driver"), The Gentle Touch, Bergerac, Armchair Theatre, Robin's Nest, Juliet Bravo, Coronation Street, Casualty, The Grimleys and Porridge - as the tattooed former seafarer 'Navy Rum'. He played PC Bruce Bannerman in 128 episodes of Z-Cars, and appeared in its spin-off Softly, Softly: Task Force - in the episode Shot In The Dark - playing a different character named Billet. 

He also played Alf Garnett's son-in-law Mike in the 1972 film The Alf Garnett Saga. Some of his other films include The Mini-Affair (1967), Otley (1968), Battle of Britain (1969), Sweeney! (1977), Hussy (1980), For Your Eyes Only (1981) and Runners (1983).

Writer
He wrote several BBC radio shows, a television food programme for TSW and a novel.

Personal life
Angelis was the oldest brother of actor Michael Angelis. Coincidentally, Michael Angelis took over from Ringo Starr as the UK narrator of Thomas the Tank Engine and Friends, who Paul Angelis voiced in the film Yellow Submarine.

Death
Angelis died on 19 March 2009 in Lambeth, London, England, at the age of 66.

Filmography

References

External links
 

1943 births
2009 deaths
Alumni of the Royal Conservatoire of Scotland
English male film actors
English male television actors
English male voice actors
English people of Greek descent
Male actors from Liverpool
Writers from Liverpool
20th-century English male writers